Bookh (Hunger) is a Bollywood film. It was released in 1947. Safdar Aah, a writer and lyricist, turned producer and director with Bhookh. Made under the Rang Mahal Ltd. banner, the film starred Sheikh Mukhtar, Kanhaiyalal, and new find actress Husna, in the main lead with music by Anil Biswas. Actress Kiran played the second female lead in her debut role. Others in the cast included Agha, Dulari, Narmada Shankar and Abu Bakar.

The film was a social drama about the poor trying to earn a living to appease their hunger, only to be oppressed by the rich corporate companies and business men.

Cast

 Sheikh Mukhtar
 Kanhaiyalal
 Husna
 Agha
 Dulari
 Narmada Shankar
 Abu Bakar

Soundtrack
The music director was Anil Biswas, with lyrics by Safdar Aah. Biswas used Shamshad Begum's voice for the first time in this film. He also sang some of the songs. One of the notable songs was "Dekho Hara Hara Ban Hawa San San San" sung by Shamshad Begum and Biswas, another was "Sare Jag Mein" sung by Biswas himself. Shamshad Begum and Geeta Dutt had first sung together in a group format for the song "Jab Chand Jawan Hoga" with singers Munawwar Sultana and Naseem in Bairam Khan (1946) under the music direction of Ghulam Haider. The song from Bhookh, "Ye Hasino Ke Mele Albele" was their first major duet together and it went on to become a success. The playback singers for the film were Geeta Dutt, Shamshad Begum and Anil Biswas.

Songlist

References

External links
 

1946 films
1940s Hindi-language films
Films scored by Anil Biswas
Indian black-and-white films